The S10 was a line number used by the Berlin S-Bahn from June 1991 until December 1999. The line operated solely in the former East Berlin and was replaced by the S8 for the northern part of the route and the S47/S9 for the southern routing.

History
Originally, the S10 ran from Oranienburg to Schönefeld International Airport when line numbering was introduced to former East Berlin lines in June 1991. With the re-construction of the direct line between Frohnau and Oranienburg for the S1, the S10 terminated at Birkenwerder from May 1992. The line was redirected to Spindlersfeld from Schönefeld International Airport in May 1993, which remained the routing until the line was withdrawn in December 1999.

Route
The station listing below provides an overview of what the line looked like. The possible travel connections are correct for the period of operation and do not reflect the current travel connections for these stations.

Common Route (in service from June 1991 to December 1999):
 Birkenwerder (S1) (DB) 
 Hohen Neuendorf (S1)
 Bergfelde
 Schönfließ 
 Mühlenbeck-Mönchmühle 
 Blankenburg (S4) (S8) 
 Pankow-Heinersdorf
 Pankow 
 Bornholmer Straße (S1) (S2) (S25)
 Schönhauser Allee (U2) (S8)
 Prenzlauer Allee 
 Greifswalder Straße 
 Landsberger Allee 
 Storkower Straße 
 Frankfurter Allee (U5) 
 Ostkreuz (S3) (S5) (S6) (S7) (S75) (S9) 
 Treptower Park (S4)
 Plänterwald 
 Baumschulenweg (S45) (S46)
 Schöneweide (S45) (S46) (S6) (S8) (S9) (DB) 

Northern Extension to Oranienburg (in service from June 1991 until May 1992):
 Borgsdorf
 Lehnitz
 Oranienburg (DB)

Southern Extension to Flughafen Schönefeld (in service from June 1991 until May 1993):
 Betriebsbahnhof Schöneweide
 Adlershof (S6) (S8)
 Altglienicke
 Grünbergallee
 Flughafen Schönefeld (S9) (DB)

Southern Re-routing to Spindlersfeld (in service from May 1993 until December 1999):
 Oberspree
 Spindlersfeld

Berlin S-Bahn lines
Railway lines opened in 1991
Railway lines closed in 1999
1991 establishments in Germany
1999 disestablishments in Germany